Jérôme Gnako (born 17 February 1968 in Bordeaux) is a French former footballer who played as an attacking midfielder or striker for several French clubs and twice for France national team.

Honours
Bordeaux
 Division 1: 1987

Monaco
 European Cup Winners' Cup runner-up: 1991–92

External links
 
 
 Profile 
 Profile and Stats
 Profile
 Career summary

1968 births
Living people
French sportspeople of Ivorian descent
French footballers
Footballers from Bordeaux
Association football midfielders
Association football forwards
France international footballers
Ligue 1 players
FC Girondins de Bordeaux players
Olympique Alès players
Angers SCO players
AS Monaco FC players
FC Sochaux-Montbéliard players
OGC Nice players